Adika Peter-McNeilly (born April 17, 1993) is a Canadian professional basketball player for the Edmonton Stingers of the Canadian Elite Basketball League (CEBL) and the BCL Americas.

Playing career

College 

Graduating from St. Mother Teresa Catholic Academy in Scarborough, Ontario, Peter-McNeilly took his game to the United States, where he spent the 2012–13 season at Clarendon College in the state of Texas.

In 2013, he transferred to Ryerson University and became a key contributor for the Rams and coach Roy Rana right away. After 73 career games played for Ryerson, the guard posted career game averages of 14.4 points, 5.2 rebounds, 3.4 assists and 1.6 steals. In four years, Peter-McNeilly shot 40.8 percent from three-point-land (150-of-368). He earned numerous honours at Ryerson, including 2017 All-Canada First Team accolades, CIS Tournament All-Star distinction in 2015, 2016 and 2017, All-OUA First Team recognition in 2016 and 2017 and the R.W. Pugh Fair Play Award in 2014–15. In 2015–16, he was a finalist for the D.H. Craighead Outstanding Contribution to Interuniversity Sport, Campus and Community Life award.

Professional career
Peter-McNeilly signed a deal with the MHP Riesen Ludwigsburg organization of the German top-flight Bundesliga in July 2017 to get his professional career underway. In July 2018, he was signed by fellow Bundesliga side Mitteldeutscher BC.

He played for the Edmonton Stingers in the 2020 CEBL season, winning the championship. Peter-McNeilly rejoined the team for the 2021 season. On December 27, 2021, he signed with ABC Athletic Constanța of the Romanian Liga Națională. He returned to Edmonton soon to join the team for their maiden campaign in the 2021–22 BCL Americas.

International career 

He competed for Canada at the 2015 World University Games in Gwangju.

References

External links

1993 births
Living people
Basketball players from Toronto
Canadian expatriate basketball people in Germany
Canadian expatriate basketball people in the United States
Canadian men's basketball players
Guards (basketball)
Junior college men's basketball players in the United States
Riesen Ludwigsburg players
Mitteldeutscher BC players
Edmonton Stingers players
Toronto Metropolitan University alumni